The Digneo-Valdez House, at 1231 Paseo de Peralta in Santa Fe, New Mexico, was built in 1939.  It was listed on the National Register of Historic Places in 1978.

It is a one-and-half-story brick house constructed by Italian immigrant and building contractor Carl Digneo.

References

National Register of Historic Places in Santa Fe County, New Mexico
Houses completed in 1889